Bangar-e Olya (also Romanized as Bāngār-e ‘Olyā) is a village in Ozgoleh Rural District, Ozgoleh District, Salas-e Babajani County, Kermanshah Province, Iran. At the 2006 census, its population was 100, in 23 families.

References 

Populated places in Salas-e Babajani County